Georg Stanford Brown (born June 24, 1943) is an American actor and director, perhaps best known as one of the stars of the ABC police television series The Rookies from 1972 to 1976. On the show, Brown played the character of Officer Terry Webster.

Personal life
Brown was seven years old when his family moved from Havana to Harlem, NY. At 15, he formed the singing group 'The Parthenons', which had a single TV appearance shortly before breaking up. Brown quit high school at 16, after being invited to do so by a few frustrated teachers. He left New York to move to Los Angeles at 17. After a few years of not being sure what he wanted to do, he decided to go back to school. He passed the college entrance exam and was admitted to Los Angeles City College where he majored in Theater Arts to "take something easy". He ended up really enjoying it and returned to New York to attend the American Musical and Dramatic Academy. He worked as a school janitor to pay his tuition.
He met his wife Tyne Daly while at AMDA, where they both studied under Philip Burton, Richard Burton's mentor. They were married for 24 years, from 1966 to 1990. They have three daughters.

Early career
Brown says he feels acting is just something he "fell into". Six months out of school, he appeared in Joseph Papp's New York Shakespeare Festival (now called Shakespeare in the Park), and next in The Comedians with Richard Burton and Elizabeth Taylor. His work then took him to Africa for four and a half months, Paris, then to Southern France and a chance meeting with Alex Haley who was on his way to Africa to work on a story he was writing (which turned out to be Roots).

Career

During the 1960s, Brown had a variety of roles in films, including Henri Philipot in The Comedians (1967), Theon Gibson in Dayton's Devils (1968), and Dr. Willard in Bullitt (1968). His 1970s films included Colossus: The Forbin Project (1970), The Man (1972), and Wild in the Sky (1972), co-starring Brandon deWilde, as anti-war, anti-establishment guerrillas, who devise a scheme to destroy Fort Knox with an atomic bomb.

Brown later played Tom Harvey (son of Chicken George, great-grandson of Kunta Kinte, and great-grandfather of Alex Haley) in the 1977 television miniseries Roots, and 1979's Roots: The Next Generations.

In 1980, he starred in the TV movie The Night the City Screamed, and in Stir Crazy opposite Gene Wilder and Richard Pryor. Later in 1984 he starred in the TV movie The Jesse Owens Story in the role of Lew Gilbert. He then went on to a supporting role in yet another miniseries North & South in 1985 as the character Garrison Grady.

In 1986, he won a Primetime Emmy Award for Outstanding Directing for a Drama Series for directing the final episode ("Parting Shots") in season 5 of Cagney & Lacey. His directing career continued with the television film Alone in the Neon Jungle (also known by its earlier name Command in Hell), which was network premiered by CBS on Sunday January 17, 1988. It was characterized in The Washington Post by Tom Shales as 'a stupefyingly preposterous bungle, but only in its better moments', while a marginally more favorable assessment praised 'cop characters that are humanized with humor and the realistically gritty feel that comes with filming on location in Pittsburgh instead of Hollywood'.

Brown co-starred in the comedy sequel House Party 2 in 1991, and the Showtime television show Linc's from 1998 thru 2000. Brown also directed several second-season episodes of the television series Hill Street Blues. More recently, Brown had a recurring role on the FX drama series Nip/Tuck.

Filmography

As Actor

Film

Television

Video Games

As Director

Television

As Producer

Television

Accolades

References

External links

1943 births
African-American male actors
American male television actors
American television directors
Cuban emigrants to the United States
Living people
Los Angeles City College alumni
People from Havana
21st-century African-American people
20th-century African-American people
American Musical and Dramatic Academy alumni